The Frank Memorial Synagogue is a synagogue in Philadelphia, Pennsylvania, United States, named after philanthropist Henry S. Frank.

It was added to the National Register of Historic Places in 1983.

The synagogue was built in 1901 on the grounds of the Jewish Hospital of Philadelphia, now the Einstein Medical Center Philadelphia.

The architect, Arnold W. Brunner, was inspired by the recent publication of images of several Roman-era synagogues in Israel, particularly the handsome and largely intact synagogue at Kfar Bar'am.  Several synagogues had been studied by the British Palestine Exploration Fund and illustrations were published in the Jewish Encyclopedia.

The Frank Memorial synagogue replicated the round arch of the door of the standing ruin at Kfar Bar'am, and the lintel from the smaller synagogue at Kfar Bar'am that is now in the Louvre.  The inscription on the lintel is taken from that inscription and reads, in Hebrew, "Peace be upon the place, and on all the places of Israel." Over the door is a seven-branched Menorah in a wreath, copied from the ancient Nabratein synagogue. The synagogue's floors are set with mosaics, although it was built before mosaic synagogue floors had been discovered in ancient synagogues in Israel.

The supervising architect was Frank Furness, who had been the principal architect of the Jewish Hospital since 1871.

References

Synagogues in Philadelphia
Churches in Philadelphia
Synagogues completed in 1901
Properties of religious function on the National Register of Historic Places in Philadelphia
Neoclassical synagogues
Synagogues on the National Register of Historic Places in Pennsylvania
Logan, Philadelphia
1901 establishments in Pennsylvania